Barbara "Barb" Dutton Henrickson is a character on HBO's Big Love portrayed by Jeanne Tripplehorn. Barb is the first wife of Bill Henrickson. Barb was raised in a traditional Mormon family, outside polygamy. Bill and Barb met while in college, and married soon afterwards. Together, they had three children. Barb almost died of uterine cancer after the birth of Tancy "Teeny" Henrickson,  the youngest of Barb's children, right before Bill married his second wife Nicolette "Nicki" Grant and later, his third wife Margene Heffman.

Biography
Barb grew up in a traditional, non-polygamous LDS family. Her parents were Rockefeller Republicans, and her mother campaigned for the ratification of the Equal Rights Amendment in the 1970s. Barb's mother and sister disowned her because she followed Bill into polygamy; her sister is shown as the modern, one-husband wife, raising her three children, and holding down a job and good status in the local community. However, repeated references are made to Barb's mother "not being ready" to meet with Barb at the time of the first season of the show, presumably because of her disapproval of the plural marriage her daughter has entered into.  Barb substitute teaches first grade and seems to be the wife with the "cooler" head.  However, she is occasionally seen engaging in pagophagia during stressful situations.  She has a close relationship with youngest wife Margene Heffman, who looks up to her as the head sister-wife.

Both Nicki and Margie look up to Barb as not only a big sister, but also as a mother/authority figure.  For example, when Nicki pits herself against Margie, they both scramble to get Barb's attention and wisdom to solve the conflict, most prominently seen in the episode 'Good Guys and Bad Guys'. In this argument, Nicki has commandeered Margene's mother away from Margene, and when they find out Barb is on the phone, they both fight over the line to tell Barb their side of the story. Barb, though she's closest to Margie, is often paranoid about the youngest wife's relationship with the teenaged Henrickson children. Margie, being scarcely out of teenhood herself, has a close friendship with Ben and Sarah, causing Barb to be both jealous and scared of Margie at the same time. Barb eventually confronts Margie about her relationship with Ben, saying that it is "inappropriate", referencing the obvious one-sided attraction Ben has for his third mother.

An important theme of Season Two is Barb's realization that the polygamous religion that she is involved in is unsatisfactory in many ways; she sees conflict break out between the polygamous compounds, and observes the abusive behavior of other polygamous units (Bill's parents and Roman and his many wives). She also begins to realize that, despite she, Nicki, and Margene being off the compound, their situation is still similar to that of those women who are fighting within the compound. She also fears that her only son Ben Henrickson believes in polygamy and asks her mother to take him and introduce him to non-polygamist Mormons, hoping to erase his interest in plural marriage.

Because Margene wants to be a surrogate mother for Pam, Margene's friend and neighbor, Barb "outs' the family as polygamous to her so that the subject will no longer be in question. She also tells Bill that she rejects the idea of ever having a fourth wife, and to appease her, he offers her a board membership in his new company, Weber Gaming.

In Season 3 Barb discovers that her sister Cindy and her husband Ted have been plotting against her and Bill by supporting a Utah legislation in the works banning gambling and to suppress letters from the first Mormon leaders proving that polygamy was never intended to be abolished (these letters were later proven to be fake). She also supports Bill's dating of Ana, the waitress from Season 2, even going as far as to ask for a formal dating process, and explaining the basic beliefs of plural marriage to her. As the season progresses, Ana is seen by Bill and Barb cavorting with an ex-lover, but is later forgiven by all and subsequently marries into the family. Barb insists that Ana live with her and tells Margene and Nikki that Ana is more like a friend than a sister-wife and it is a great comfort to her. That same episode, Ana tells the family she made a mistake and divorces them. In Episode 30 the family takes a cross-country trip to discover their Mormon roots at Hill Cumorah, NY at Bill's urging. Barb discovers Nicki's birth control pack in the motel bathroom but she assumes they are Sarah's, not knowing her oldest daughter is already pregnant. When Sarah later miscarries, Barb (along with the rest of the family) is shocked, but rally to support her. Later in the season, Barb is shown struggling with her possible excommunication from the church and turns to her mother and sister for their help in sponsoring her in a sacrament ceremony. The family accepts her plea and Barb takes part in the ceremony. In the last episode of the season, Barb is questioned by the leaders of her local church and they request her to renounce polygamy. When she refuses, she is excommunicated. In response, Bill claims the keys to the kingdom of heaven and decides to found a new church for his family and other progressive polygamists.

Season Four sees Barb taking a leadership role at the casino that the family has opened on a Blackfoot Indian reservation, but coming into conflict with Native American customs and culture.  She at first opposes daughter Sarah's choice of a secular Justice of the Peace marriage, worried that she and her husband will not reunite in eternity. At the end of season four, Barb explains to Bill that she wants a change in lifestyle and she wants a divorce but, reluctantly stands by Bill when he announces to the world that they're polygamists.

The show's fifth and final season sees Barb going through a spiritual awakening which leads her to, amongst other things, develop an interest in the priesthood. Bill flatly rejects the idea that women can hold the priesthood, initiating a rift between Barb and her spouses (Nicki sharing Bill's view and Margie siding with them). Barb seeks out Mormon and non-Mormon feminist scholars to support her, causing her mother and sister to express their concern over her new theological ideas. Events come to a head when Barb decides to be baptized in a Latter Day Saint denomination that allows women to hold the priesthood but rejects polygamy. Barb ultimately decides to return to her family and their own church. At the end of the series, as Bill lies dying on the street, he sees a halo around Barb and asks her to bless him as he dies. A flash forward in the series's closing moments reveals that Barb is now the leader of the only Mormon fundamentalist church that practices both polygamy and female priesthood.

Big Love characters